Luxembourg, officially the Grand Duchy of Luxembourg, is a sovereign country in western Europe.

Luxembourg or Luxemburg may also refer to:

Places

Luxembourg
 Luxembourg City, the capital city
 Luxembourg District, one of three districts
 Luxembourg (canton), one subdivision of Luxembourg district
 County of Luxemburg, a state of the Holy Roman Empire
 Duchy of Luxemburg, a state of the Holy Roman Empire
 Luxembourg (European Parliament constituency), a constituency in the European Parliament

Belgium
 Luxembourg (Belgium), a province of Wallonia, Belgium
 Place du Luxembourg, a square in Brussels

France
 Luxembourg Garden, in Paris
 Luxembourg Palace, located inside the Luxembourg Garden
 Musée du Luxembourg, in Paris

United States
 Luxemburg, Iowa
 Luxemburg, Wisconsin
 Luxemburg Township, Stearns County, Minnesota

People
 Christoph Luxenberg, a pseudonymous author
 François-Henri de Montmorency, duc de Luxembourg, a Marshal of France
 Rosa Luxemburg (born Rosalia Luxemburg; 1871–1919), a Polish-German Marxist revolutionary
 Vladimir Lyuksemburg (1888–1971), a Russian Communist, member of the first Bolshevik government of Ukraine
 Rut Blees Luxemburg (born 1967), German photographer
 Wilhelmus Luxemburg (1929–2018), American mathematician
 House of Luxembourg, a medieval German royal family

Music
 Luxembourg (album), an album by the English band The Bluetones
 Luxembourg (band), a British five-piece indie band
 "Luxembourg", a song by Elvis Costello on his album Trust

Other
 Luxembourg (horse), Thoroughbred racehorse

See also
 Luxembourgish language, a language that is spoken mainly in Luxembourg
 Lüksemburq, Azerbaijan
 Lyuksemburg, Dagestan, Russia
 
 :Category:National sports teams of Luxembourg, teams called "Luxembourg"